Javier Masís (born 16 April 1953) is a Costa Rican former footballer. He competed in the men's tournament at the 1980 Summer Olympics.

References

External links
 

1953 births
Living people
Costa Rican footballers
Costa Rica international footballers
Olympic footballers of Costa Rica
Footballers at the 1980 Summer Olympics
Footballers from San José, Costa Rica
Association football defenders
Deportivo Saprissa players